The 2006 Northeast Conference baseball tournament began on May 25 and ended on May 27, 2006, at FirstEnergy Park in Lakewood, New Jersey.  The league's top four teams competed in the double elimination tournament.  Fourth-seeded  won their first tournament championship and earned the Northeast Conference's automatic bid to the 2006 NCAA Division I baseball tournament.

Seeding and format
The top four finishers were seeded one through four based on conference regular-season winning percentage.

Bracket

All-Tournament Team
The following players were named to the All-Tournament Team.

Most Valuable Player
Bobby McKee of Sacred Heart was named Tournament Most Valuable Player.

References

Tournament
Northeast Conference Baseball Tournament
Northeast Conference baseball tournament
Northeast Conference baseball tournament